American singer-actress Cher has embarked on seven concert tours and three concert residencies. As a solo artist, Cher has made concerts in North America, Europe, Australia and Asia. Cher's first ever concert was with her ex-husband Sonny Bono in 1966 at the Hollywood Bowl in Los Angeles.

In 1979, Cher started her first solo concert tour, the Cher in Concert Tour, with performances in Europa and North America in 1979. After the success with disco music, Cher and her boyfriend at the time, Les Dudek, formed the new wave band Black Rose with which she did her first mini-tour, The Black Rose Show. Black Rose band during their tour were the opening act for Bob Seger in Europe and for Hall & Oates during the 1980 summer in North America.

After eight years off the road, Cher did her second solo sold-out tour in 1990, the Heart of Stone Tour, which was followed up by 1992's Love Hurts Tour. The Love Hurts Tour is well known by fans for cancellations due to Cher's illness.

After the huge success of the Believe album, she did her 1999/2000 Do You Believe? tour.
Finally, in 2002, she embarked on her so far last concert tour, the marathon Living Proof: The Farewell Tour, which lasted from June 2002 until April 2005. The tour featured a total 325 shows, the most ever for a concert tour by a female solo artist, and grossed more than $250 million, becoming Cher's highest-grossing tour ever. Cher closed the farewell tour in April 2005 at the Hollywood Bowl. It was the most successful tour by a single female solo artist at that time.

From May 2008 until February 2011, Cher performed at The Colosseum at Caesars Palace in Las Vegas, Nevada with her new show, Cher at the Colosseum. She signed for 200 shows over the span of three years. She was paid $60 million for her return.

After her residency at the Caesars Palace which lasted from 2008-2011, Cher began touring with the Dressed to Kill Tour in 2014 after the release of her album Closer to the Truth. Cher is one of the most successful touring artists, she was placed at number three among most successful female artists and at number twenty three overall on Billboard Top Live Artists From 1990-2014 list.

Concert tours

Concert residencies

References

 
Cher

hu:Cher filmjei